TVO (stylized as tvo), formerly known as TVOntario, is a publicly funded English-language educational television network and media organization serving the Canadian province of Ontario. It operates flagship station CICA-DT (channel 19) in Toronto, which also relays programming across portions of Ontario through eight rebroadcast stations. All pay television (cable, satellite, IPTV) providers throughout Ontario are required to carry TVO on their basic tier, and programming can be streamed for free online within Canada.

TVO is operated by the Ontario Educational Communications Authority (OECA), a Crown corporation owned by the Government of Ontario, which since 2022 has done business as the TVO Media Education Group (or TVO.me). TVO.me also operates TVO Today, TVO ILC, TVO Learn, and TVOKids.

Governance, funding and other responsibilities
TVO is governed by a volunteer board of directors, and supported by a network of regional councillors from across the province. TVO also reports to the Ontario legislature through the Minister of Education, in accordance with the Ontario Educational Communications Authority Act.

Instead of following the model of the federally owned Canadian Broadcasting Corporation (CBC)'s television services, which shows commercial advertisements, TVO chose a commercial-free model similar to the Public Broadcasting Service (PBS) in the United States (in fact, various TVO productions wound up being aired on PBS stations). This model was later emulated by provincial educational broadcasters Télé-Québec in Quebec and Knowledge Network in British Columbia. The majority of TVO's funding is provided by the Government of Ontario through the Ministry of Education, which provides $39 million annually, with additional funding provided by charitable donations.

TVO is also responsible for over-the-air broadcasts of the Ontario Legislative Assembly in some remote Northern Ontario communities that do not receive cable television access to the Ontario Parliament Network.

In 2002, the Ministry of Education transferred responsibility for the Independent Learning Centre—the agency which provides distance education at the elementary and secondary school level—to TVO.

TVO used to operate TFO (Télévision française de l'Ontario), a separate but similar network for Franco-Ontarian audiences. Before the launch of TFO, TVO aired French-language programming on Sundays. Even after TFO's launch, TVO and TFO swapped programming on Sundays well into the 1990s. TFO was separated from TVO and was incorporated under the newly formed GroupeMédia TFO, a separate Crown corporation of the Government of Ontario, in 2007.

In 2017 and 2018, TVO launched four regional "hubs", featuring journalism on issues in the various regions of Ontario, on its website. Hubs are currently based in Thunder Bay for the Northwestern Ontario region, Sudbury for Northeastern Ontario, Kingston for Eastern Ontario, and London for Southwestern Ontario. In 2019, the service also launched an Indigenous hub to cover First Nations issues throughout the province.

History

1970s

The Ontario Educational Communications Authority (OECA) was created in June 1970 by then Education Minister Bill Davis. At that time, the OECA produced children's and educational programming which was aired on commercial television stations.

The CBC, acting on behalf of OECA, applied for and won a licence for the ministry's television station in Toronto. CICA, with the mandate of "[using] electronic and associated media to provide educational opportunities for all people in Ontario". The "CA" in the CICA callsign was derived from the last two letters in the OECA acronym. CBC operated the CICA transmitter, while the OECA was in charge of programming. OECA assumed all operations of the station, independent of the CBC, when the provincial government declared the Authority an independent corporation in a 1973 Order-in-Council.

CICA signed on the air on September 27, 1970, operating at a radiated power of 423,000 watts video and 84,600 watts audio. Its studio facilities were located at 1670 Bayview Avenue (a five-storey office building that is still standing) and its  transmitter antenna was located at 354 Jarvis Street on the CBC tower. In 1972, the station moved its operations to a new studio facility at 2180 Yonge Street in the Canada Square Complex, where it remains. The station's broadcast name was "OECA", sharing the name of its parent organization, but began using the on-air brand "TVOntario" (and later just TVO) beginning in 1974.

When the Global Television Network was originally approved, it was with a proposal that OECA would broadcast across southern Ontario during the daytime using Global's six transmitters, as Global's own programming only ran from 5 p.m. to midnight. However, when Global launched in 1974, this proposal was not implemented.

In the latter half of the 1970s, TVO began adding rebroadcast transmitters in other Ontario communities. Its first rebroadcast transmitter, CICO (now CICO-24), signed on from Ottawa on October 25, 1975.

1980s–1990s

In 1987, TVOntario launched La Chaîne française, a French-language public television network which became TFO in 1995. The Ontario government under Mike Harris promised to privatize TVOntario. They never carried through on this plan, but did cut its budget.

2000s

The positions of chair and CEO were divided in 2005. Film producer Peter O'Brian was appointed chairman and Lisa de Wilde became CEO. On June 29, 2006, the provincial Ministry of Education announced a major overhaul of TVO: its production capabilities would be upgraded to fully digital systems by 2009 (ministry funding would be allocated for this); and TFO would be spun off into a separate organization.

Moreover, programming changes were announced later that day: thirteen hours of new weekly children's educational programming was added, Studio 2 was replaced by The Agenda, and More to Life and Vox were cancelled. The move to digitize services represents a transition; The Globe and Mail quoted TVO CEO Lisa de Wilde saying "while television will remain an important medium for TVO, the days of defining ourselves as only a broadcaster are past."

In 2002, the Independent Learning Centre, which is responsible for distance education at the elementary and secondary school level, and for GED testing, was transferred from the Ministry of Education to TVO.

Chairs and CEOs
 Thomas Ide (1970–1979)
 Jim Parr (1979–1985)
 John Radford (1985)
 Bernard Ostry (1985–1991)
 Peter Herrndorf (1992–1999)
 Isabel Bassett (1999–2005)

The positions of Chair of the Board and CEO were divided in 2005

Chair
 Peter O'Brian (2005–2018)
 Chris Day (2020–present)

CEO
Lisa de Wilde (2005–2019)
Jeffrey Orridge (November 30, 2020 — present)

Programming

TVO airs a mixture of original children's programming, documentaries, scripted dramas, and public affairs programs.

Children's programming is aired daily during a daytime television block branded as TVOKids, with general-audience programming airing during prime time and overnight hours for adult viewers. Scripted dramas are typically foreign imports, past selections include the Danish political drama Borgen and the British police procedural New Tricks. TVO's first original drama series was Hard Rock Medical, a medical drama set in Sudbury, which aired from 2013 to 2018. Public affairs programming includes the flagship daily current affairs show The Agenda and an overnight rebroadcast of the Legislative Assembly of Ontario's Question Period from the Ontario Parliament Network.

All TVO programming is aired in English or in another language with English subtitles. French-language programs were previously shown on Sundays, from noon until sign-off, for the benefit of Franco-Ontarian viewers. The establishment of French counterpart network TFO led to the discontinuation of French-language programming on TVO by the mid-1990s.

Former programming
Earlier in TVO's history, all dramatic programming was required to have some educational content. Therefore actors, journalists or writers were hired to provide commentary on shows aired by TVO that would place them within an educational context. For instance, Tom Grattan's War was bookmarked by segments hosted by Andrea Martin that would use scenes from the series to discuss filmmaking techniques. Episodes of The Prisoner were hosted by journalist Warner Troyer whose segments included interviews with the actors and a discussion of various psychological, philosophical or sociological themes regarding the series. Similarly, Doctor Who was hosted by science fiction author Judith Merril who would discuss each week's episode to explore various themes in science and science fiction. Saturday Night at the Movies continued to follow this format long after the requirement was dropped because of the popularity of its host, Elwy Yost.

Distribution
TVO is Canada's oldest educational television service. It established the country's first UHF television station in 1970, based in Toronto. TVO used to have the largest over-the-air coverage in Ontario, reaching 98.5% of the province with 216 transmitters; however this is no longer the case as the broadcaster shuttered the majority of its analogue transmitters except those located in some mandatory markets, which were converted to digital in 2011 (see "Technical information" below). TVO is carried on all cable systems serving Ontario (the alternative choice for those viewers in area that has been served by one of the service's defunct analogue transmitters). On satellite systems in Ontario, it is carried on Bell Satellite TV channel 265, and on Shaw Direct channel 155.

The main transmitter in Toronto uses the call sign CICA-DT, with its rebroadcasters using CICO-DT followed by a number to denote their status as rebroadcasters. Many analogue transmitters used CICA-TV and CICO-TV callsigns, in addition to CICE-TV, until the shutdown of TVO's remaining analogue transmitters on July 31, 2012.

TVO's transmitters are primarily located in Ontario, with the only exception being its Ottawa transmitter, CICO-DT-24, which is based at Camp Fortune in Chelsea, Quebec. There, it shares its site with its Quebec counterpart, Télé-Québec, and with most of the region's television and FM radio signals.

From the 1970s through the 1990s, TVO ran top-of-the-hour bumpers where an announcer would mention the channel allocation of the service's flagship station in Toronto, along with an allocation for one of its rebroadcast transmitters: "This is TVOntario. Channel 19 in Toronto, channel XX in (city/town/region)."

Technical information

Subchannel

Analogue-to-digital conversion

In August 2010, TVO began broadcasting in high-definition via a direct-to-cable HD feed. TVO commenced over-the-air HD broadcasting in August 2011, in compliance with the CRTC regulations. Except for Belleville, Chatham and Cloyne, TVO's transmitters are located within mandatory markets for conversion. Not all digital transmitters are currently broadcasting in high definition.

The Belleville, Chatham and Cloyne transmitters were converted to digital on new frequencies (but without high-definition, an on-channel program guide or other DTV-specific features), as channels 52 to 69 were being reallocated for wireless communication purposes. The conversion of these transmitters took place before TVO's announcement to close down its analogue transmitter network outside the mandatory markets.

Transmitters

On January 25, 2017, TVO announced it would be shutting down eight of its nine remaining transmitters (a mere 5½ years after converting them to digital), leaving only CICA-DT at Toronto's CN Tower in operation to maintain their current license. CEO Lisa de Wilde announced that shutting down the transmitters would save the broadcaster an estimated $1 million per year, but would also lay off seven transmitter maintenance jobs. Critics of the decision, including the group Friends of Canadian Broadcasting, said that the changes would affect people who have no other options for accessing content.

TVO formally applied to the CRTC on January 25, 2017 to remove its eight transmitters outside Toronto from service.

In response to feedback from the towns and cities affected by the planned shutdown, as well as TVO donors and other groups, TVO reversed its decision to shut down the transmitters on February 17, 2017. According to TVO, the Government of Ontario agreed to increase TVO's annual funding by $1 million to offset the amount that would have been saved by shutting down the transmitters. On March 1, 2017, TVO formally withdrew its CRTC application to delete its eight retransmitters from its licence.

In April 2017, ISED required TVO to move its newly-digital retransmitters serving Belleville, Chatham, Cloyne, Kitchener, and Windsor from out of the 600 MHz band between 2019 and 2020 as part of the related spectrum pack.

On April 17, 2020, the CRTC granted TVO permission to decrease its Chatham transmitter's maximum effective radiated power (ERP) from 2,250 to 1,000 watts. Even though this would reduce over-the-air access to viewers in the Chatham area, the CRTC approved TVO's request so that it could "reduce the costs associated with the required channel change by re-using its existing antenna" as part of Canada's 600 MHz spectrum repack. TVO announced it would make the change as of May 1, 2020. TVO similarly reduced the ERP of its other retransmitters required to move out of the 600 MHz band.

Former transmitters

On July 31, 2012, TVO permanently shut down its remaining 114 analogue transmitters (14 full-power and 100 low-power) without converting them to digital; these were in areas of Ontario not considered "mandatory markets" for digital conversion by the CRTC. In many cases, TVO rebroadcasters were operating from CBC-owned transmitter sites and were shut down along with the CBC's analogue transmitters. Where TVO owned sites, it provided local communities the option of taking ownership of the towers and transmitters.

Low-power transmitters

Medium-power transmitters

High-power transmitters

Carriage dispute
On June 6, 2012, TVO dropped its signal from cable and satellite providers outside Ontario, due to a carriage dispute over compensation for distributing its signal to its subscribers outside the province. The network reached an agreement with Vidéotron, and then entered negotiations with Shaw Communications and Telus, but failed to reach an agreement with Bell Canada. TVO cited that: "...we believe that we have a responsibility to earn revenues from the sale of our service outside of our home province. TVO is willing to consent to cable and satellite distributors carrying our signal outside the province, provided that we're fairly compensated. Since cable or satellite distributors receive subscriber revenues driven by having TVO as part of their offering, we feel it's reasonable to be compensated. Unfortunately, we could not come to an agreement with Bell to compensate TVO for carrying our signal outside of Ontario, and the decision was made to cease offering our signal outside of Ontario." As a result, the only cable and satellite customers outside Ontario that can still view TVO are on the Quebec side of the Ottawa–Gatineau market.

It is unknown if the dispute or carriage restrictions also apply to the few cable systems in the United States that carry TVO.

References

External links

TVO Today
TVO Learn
TVOKids
Tribute to TVOKids shows from the 1970s
CICA-TV/TVOntario History - Canadian Communications Foundation

(Recnet links cover all repeaters using the above call signs)

 
1970 establishments in Ontario
Crown corporations of Ontario
Television channels and stations established in 1970